Port Elgin (Pryde Field) Airport, formerly , was located  north of Port Elgin, Ontario, Canada.

See also
 Port Elgin Airport

References

Defunct airports in Ontario